The UCF Knights baseball team represents The University of Central Florida in National Collegiate Athletics Association (NCAA) Division I. The Knights compete in the American Athletic Conference (The American). The Knights play their home games on UCF's main campus in Orlando, Florida at John Euliano Park, and are currently coached by head coach Greg Lovelady.

History

Early history (1973–1983)
Though UCF baseball first took the field in 1973, its history dates back to 1970 with UCF's club baseball team, the FTU Goldsox. The Goldsox played in the Amateur Baseball League of Central Florida and were managed by Jack Pantelias, who led them from 1970 to midway through the 1972 season. When Pantelias resigned, he was replaced by Doug Holmquist, who would lead the team through the end of the season on an interim basis before being named head coach before the 1973 season.

The team has been nationally ranked at times during the course of 11 seasons, including the highest ranking of No. 7 during both the 2001 and 2012 seasons.

Bergman era (1983–2008)
Jay Bergman took over the program in 1983 after serving as the head coach at Seminole Community College. The Knights first season in Division I was in 1985 under Bergman. The Knights earned a 52–34–1 record in their first D–I season. Bergman was forced to retire during the 2008 season after allegations surfaced of him harassing an equipment manager.

Bergman had a large amount of success in this position, leading UCF to Atlantic Sun Championships in 93, 95, 96, 97, 00, 01, 02, 04 and NCAA Regional Appearances in 89, 93, 95, 96, 97, 00, 01, 02, 04, and brought UCF to a national ranking of No. 7 in 2001. In honor of his long-term success with the Knights, on February 3, 2001, UCF opened and dedicated Jay Bergman Field.

Rooney era (2009–2016)
Terry Rooney became head coach in 2008 after serving as an assistant coach at LSU, Notre Dame, Stetson, Old Dominion, James Madison, and George Washington. In his second season, Rooney led the Knights to a 33–22 (10–14) record, 11 more wins than the prior season and the best conference record since the team started in Conference USA in 2006. On June 21, 2010, Rooney signed a four-year contract extension with the university, making him the Knights head baseball coach through 2014.

Following a 38–21 season, Rooney led the Knights to their first NCAA tournament under his leadership in 2011. The year was a high for the Knights, defeating the No 4. ranked Florida Gators in Gainesville and the then-ranked No. 5 Gators in Orlando. The Knights also defeated the No. 6 ranked Florida State Seminoles in Tallahassee during the 2011 campaign. In 2012, Rooney led the Knights to a No. 7 ranking during week ten, and an appearance in the Coral Gables Regional.

From 2013 to 2016, the Knights were 121-114 under Rooney's leadership. UCF did not appear in another NCAA tournament despite a 36–23 record in 2014 where Rooney won American Athletic Conference Coach of the Year. In 2015, the Knights were 22-7 and ranked No. 6 in the nation through their first 30 games but eventually ended the season 31–27. After going 26–33 in 2016 despite a 6–0 start, Rooney departed from UCF and eventually joined the Alabama staff as an assistant coach.

Lovelady era (2017–Present)
On August 22, 2016, Jay Bergman Field was renamed John Euliano Park.

Greg Lovelady was hired as Rooney's replacement in July 2016 after serving as Head Coach at Wright State. Lovelady brought immediate success back to the UCF Baseball program, leading the Knights to a 40–22 record in 2017. The Knights were crowned American Athletic Conference Regular Season Champions but went 2–2 in the conference tournament, being eliminated by East Carolina in the semifinals. The Knights received a 2 seed in the Tallahassee Regional of the NCAA tournament but were eliminated by Florida State after losing their first game to Auburn.

Championships

Conference tournament championships

Conference season championships

NCAA tournament

Stadium

John Euliano Park is located on UCF's main campus in Orlando, Florida. It was originally built in 2001 as a state-of-the-art facility, and features an indoor training facility with three batting cages and two pitching mounds. The facility was originally named after the Knights' former head coach, Jay Bergman. It retained the name until 2016, when it was named after alumnus and donor John Euliano.

Renovations
Within the last few years, John Euliano Park has been expanded from 1,980 seats to 2,230. The stadium can also accommodate another 1,000 fans on grass berms along the first and third base lines. In the next few years seating will be further expanded to a total capacity at 4,180. In addition, a new digital scoreboard and beautification has taken place as part of the renovation.

Head coaches

Year-by-year results

UCF and MLB

Cody Allen  – Pitcher, Cleveland Indians
Drew Butera  – Catcher, Kansas City Royals
Matt Fox – Former Pitcher, Boston Red Sox, Minnesota Twins, and Seattle Mariners
Ben Lively – Pitcher, Philadelphia Phillies
Mike Maroth – Former Pitcher, Detroit Tigers and St. Louis Cardinals
Chad Mottola – Former Outfielder, Cincinnati Reds, Toronto Blue Jays, Miami Marlins, and Baltimore Orioles
Rob Radlosky – Former Pitcher, Minnesota Twins
Eric Skoglund – Pitcher, Kansas City Royals
Esix Snead – Former Outfielder, New York Mets
Darnell Sweeney – Infielder, Philadelphia Phillies
Clay Timpner – Former Outfielder, San Francisco Giants
Daniel Winkler – Pitcher, Atlanta Braves

See also

List of NCAA Division I baseball programs
List of UCF Knights baseball seasons

References

External links

 

 
Baseball teams established in 1973
1973 establishments in Florida